Transferts ("transfers") is a French science fiction thriller television series created by Claude Scasso and Patrick Benedek in 2017. The show aired for one season on Netflix.

Synopsis
In the near future, Florian, a cabinetmaker and father of two, is taking a trip on a sailboat with his family, when he falls into the water and sinks. He wakes up after five years of being in a coma, in the body of Sylvain, a police captain at the BATI, a special division that tracks down "transferred" people. These are individuals whose spirit, or self, has been transferred from one body to another using a new medical procedure. Originally legalized for therapeutic purposes, "transfers" have since become prohibited following rejections called "counter-transfers", in which transferred patients experience a form of psychosis and turn violent.

Cast and characters
 Arieh Worthalter as Captain Sylvain Bernard/Florian Bassot
 Brune Renault as Lieutenant Béatrice Lourmel
 Toinette Laquière as Sophie Bassot
 Steve Tientcheu as Captain Gabriel Finan
 Pili Groyne as Liza/Woyzeck
 Patrick Descamps as Vincent Mareuil
 Patrick Raynal as Dr. Michel Vautier
 Xavier Lafitte as Father Luc
 Juliette Plumecocq-Mech as Fausto
 Emilien Vekemans as Fabrice Bernard
 Aïssatou Diop as Viviane Metzger
 Balthazar Monfé as Thomas Bassot
 Zélie Rixhon as Julie Bassot
 Sébastien Chassagne as Damien Volber
 Thierry Frémont as Paul Dangeac
 Alexis Loret as Florian Bassot
 Marie Kremer as Oriane Mareuil
 Édith Scob as Alexandra Staniowska
 Jean-Marie Winling as Alexandre Syrmay
 Bastien Bouillon as Gaëtan Syrmay/Alexandre Syrmay
 Camille Voglaire as Clara
 David Quertigniez as Jacques Lantier

Filming
Although set in France, the series was filmed in Brussels, Belgium from April to June 2016. Prominent landmarks which can be seen in the show include the church of Saint John the Baptist at the Béguinage, the Centre for Fine Arts, the Temple of Human Passions, and the dam at Eau d'Heure lakes.

The 2016 Brussels bombings on the eve of filming complicated the street scenes and the staging of an armed militia.

Reception
The series received an excellent critical response in France. Le Parisien wrote that it is "a gem of science fiction with a fascinating scenario, a neat universe, and excellent actors. Finally some real (and good) French science fiction!", addedTélé-Loisirs. Télé 7 Jours wrote that it was a "...genre that is rarely seen on French television", and  added that the show "stimulates some philosophical questioning".
La Croix opined that Transferts "raises many questions that resonate with current events and takes a critical look at the abuses that lie in wait for us: commodification of the body, security escalation…".
According to Le Monde, "The six episodes imagined by Claude Scasso and Patrick Benedek are appropriate for the time. They are a compilation of all contemporary social fears."
Télérama added, "Transferts creates a universe, explores a theme, deploys a philosophical question, and does not forget the notion of entertainment."

Recognition
 Festival Séries Mania 2017
 Best series
 Best actor for Arieh Worthalter

References

External links
 
 

2010s French television series
Thriller television series
French science fiction television series
Dystopian television series
2017 French television series debuts
French-language Netflix original programming
Techno-thrillers
Television shows set in France